Baba Jan-e Palizi (also Romanized as Bābā Jān-e Pālīzī) is a village in Baladarband Rural District, in the Central District of Kermanshah County, Kermanshah Province, Iran. At the 2006 census, its population was 446, in 103 families.

References 

Populated places in Kermanshah County